Western Rite or Western liturgical rite can refer to:

 Latin liturgical rites, liturgical rites of the Latin Church, also known as the Western Church, which is the main part of the Catholic Church
 Western Rite Orthodoxy, designation for Christian communities within Eastern Orthodoxy or Oriental Orthodoxy, that use traditional western liturgies
 any other liturgical rite of western origin or use in Christian liturgy
 Western Syriac Rite, western variant of the Syriac Rite, itself belonging to the family of Eastern liturgical rites

See also
 Eastern Rite (disambiguation)